The 2024 United States House of Representatives elections in Alabama will be held on November 5, 2024, to elect the seven U.S. Representatives from the state of Alabama, one from each of the state's seven congressional districts. The elections will coincide with the 2024 U.S. presidential election, as well as other elections to the House of Representatives, elections to the United States Senate, and various state and local elections.

District 1

The 1st district encompasses Washington, Mobile, Baldwin, Escambia and Monroe counties, including the cities of Mobile, Bay Minette, Foley, and Monroeville. The incumbent is Republican Jerry Carl, who was re-elected with 83.6% of the vote in 2022, with no Democratic challenger.

Republican primary

Candidates

Filed paperwork
David Whitlock, house cleaner

Potential
Jerry Carl, incumbent U.S. Representative

Democratic primary

Candidates

Filed paperwork
Gary Johnson, businessman and pastor

General election

Predictions

District 2

The 2nd district encompasses most of the Montgomery metropolitan area, and stretches into the Wiregrass Region in the southeastern portion of the state, including Andalusia, Dothan, Greenville, and Troy. The incumbent is Republican Barry Moore, who was re-elected with 69.1% of the vote in 2022.

Republican primary

Candidates

Potential
Barry Moore, incumbent U.S. Representative

Democratic primary

Candidates

Filed paperwork
Austin Vigue, political consultant

General election

Predictions

District 3

The 3rd district is based in eastern Alabama, taking in small parts of Montgomery, as well as Anniston, Auburn, Talladega and Tuskegee. The incumbent is Republican Mike Rogers, who was re-elected with 71.2% of the vote in 2022.

Republican primary

Candidates

Formed exploratory committee
Robert L. McCollum, businessman and candidate for Alabama Public Service Commission in 2022

Potential
Mike Rogers, incumbent U.S. Representative

General election

Predictions

District 4

The 4th district is located in rural north-central Alabama, spanning the Evangelical belt area, including Cullman, Gadsden, and Jasper. The incumbent is Republican Robert Aderholt, who was re-elected with 84.1% of the vote in 2022.

Republican primary

Candidates

Potential
Robert Aderholt, incumbent U.S. Representative

General election

Predictions

District 5

The 5th district is based in northern Alabama, including the city of Huntsville, as well as Athens, Decatur, Florence, and Scottsboro. The incumbent is first-term Republican Dale Strong, who was elected with 67.1% of the vote in 2022.

Republican primary

Candidates

Potential
Dale Strong, incumbent U.S. Representative

General election

Predictions

District 6

The 6th district encompasses Greater Birmingham, taking in parts of Birmingham, as well as the surrounding suburbs, including Bibb, Blount, Chilton, Coosa, and Shelby counties. Other cities include Alabaster, Hoover and Montevallo. The incumbent is Republican Gary Palmer, who was re-elected with 83.7% of the vote in 2022, with no Democratic challenger.

Palmer's re-election campaign gained attention due to his 2014 signing of the U.S. Term Limits Pledge and campaign promise to not run for more than five terms to Congress. Palmer's previous statements meant that he would have retired in 2024, however, Palmer chose to seek a sixth term in this election. Palmer cited his reasons for seeking re-election, including recent high turnover in Alabama's congressional delegation, his rise to Republican leadership within the House of Representatives, and personal prayer, saying that he had "prayed for God to give me clarity on it". He disputed media reports (including an article by AL.com) that characterized his five-term limit as being part of the U.S. Term Limits pledge, when in fact, the pledge only applied to sponsoring legislation. However, Palmer acknowledged that he did claim during his 2014 campaign that he would serve no more than five terms, and said he would "own that", regarding breaking that campaign promise.

Republican primary

Candidates

Declared
Gary Palmer, incumbent U.S. Representative

General election

Predictions

District 7

The 7th district encompasses the Black Belt, including Selma and Demopolis, as well as taking in majority-black areas of Birmingham, Tuscaloosa, and Montgomery. The incumbent is Democrat Terri Sewell, who was re-elected with 63.5% of the vote in 2022.

Sewell has filed paperwork to run for re-election in 2024.

Democratic primary

Candidates

Filed paperwork
Terri Sewell, incumbent U.S. Representative

General election

Predictions

References

External links
Official campaign websites for 1st district candidates
 Gary Johnson (D) for Congress
Official campaign websites for 6th district candidates
 Gary Palmer (R) for Congress

2024
Alabama
United States House of Representatives